Joseph Pierre Marius "Pete, Pit" Morin (December 8, 1915 – January 5, 2000) was a professional ice hockey forward who played a single season for the Montreal Canadiens of the NHL.

Playing career
Morin was born and raised in the Montreal suburb of Lachine and began playing for the Montreal Royals of the QSHL in 1936. There, he skated alongside Buddy O'Connor and Gerry Heffernan and the trio became known as the "Razzle Dazzle" line. In 1941–42 the three played together for the Canadiens. In 31 games he recorded 10 goals and 12 assists for 22 points and appeared as a promising forward. Yet an injury cut his NHL career short and he returned to the less competitive QSHL where he continued to put up productive numbers. He was also a member of the Montreal Royal Canadian Air Force team for two years during World War II.

References

External links

 
 

1915 births
2000 deaths
Canadian military personnel of World War II
Ice hockey people from Montreal
Montreal Canadiens players
People from Lachine, Quebec
Canadian ice hockey left wingers